Mengzi may refer to:

Mencius (孟子), 372–289 BCE, Chinese philosopher
Mencius (book), a collection of anecdotes and conversations of the philosopher Mencius
Mengzi City (蒙自), Yunnan, China